Bosnian Canadians are Canadian citizens whose ancestry can be traced to Bosnia and Herzegovina. At the 2011 Canadian census, 22,920 people stated that they are of Bosnian descent.
The majority of Bosnian Canadians immigrated to Canada as refugees during and after the Bosnian War, which lasted from 1992-1995. The history of Bosnian arrivals to Canada, however, dates back to as far as the 19th century.

History
The traditional centers of residence and culture for Bosnian Canadians are located in Toronto, Montreal, Edmonton and Calgary. Numerous Bosnian language newspapers and other periodicals are published in many states. The largest Bosnian organisation in Canada is the Congress of North American Bosniaks.

Religion

The Bosnian Islamic Association Gazi Husrev-beg was founded in November 1977 under the name 'Association of Islamic Community Gazi Husrev-Beg'. It has been operating under its current name (BIAGH) ever since 1995. The primary reason for its foundation was to respond to the religious needs of its members. That was made possible through a full-time imam, who has been serving this community uninterruptedly since June 1982. The BIAGH caters to the needs of Bosniaks that pertain to Bosniak tradition, folklore, sport and different creative workshops.

Most Bosnian-Canadians either identify as Muslim, Eastern Orthodox, Catholic or non-religious.

Notable Bosnian Canadians
 Asmir Begović, soccer player and Bosnia and Herzegovina international 
Blagoje Bratić, soccer player
 Zijad Delić, imam, activist, teacher, scholar and public speaker
 Merlin Dervisevic, director of Cruel and Unusual
 Igor Drljaca, film director
 Johnathan Kovacevic, hockey player
 Vladimir Kuljanin, basketball player
 Nemanja Mitrović, basketball player
 Mila Mulroney, wife of the 18th Prime Minister of Canada, Brian Mulroney
 Neven Pajkić, boxer
 Dina Pandzic, model 
 Diego Kapelan, basketball player
 Admir Salihović, soccer player
 Goran Simić, poet
 Alija Solak, soccer player and Canadian international
 Nik Zoricic (1983–2012), skier

See also

Immigration to Canada

References

Bosnia and Herzegovina diaspora
Bosniak diaspora
European Canadian
 
Bosnian